Bob Schoonbroodt (born 12 February 1991) is a Dutch former racing cyclist. He rode at the 2013 UCI Road World Championships.

Major results
2009
 1st  Time trial, National Junior Road Championships
 1st Omloop Het Nieuwsblad Juniors
 4th Overall Liège–La Gleize
 9th Overall Grand Prix Rüebliland
2012
 2nd Time trial, National Under-23 Road Championships
2014
 6th Overall Tour of Taihu Lake
1st Stage 8
2015
 2nd Overall Olympia's Tour
 2nd GP Viborg
2016
 5th Time trial, National Road Championships

References

External links

1991 births
Living people
Dutch male cyclists
Sportspeople from Heerlen
Cyclists from Limburg (Netherlands)
21st-century Dutch people